The 2008–09 season was the 107th season of competitive football in Italy.

Overview 
 Chievo made their return to Serie A after just one season in the second tier.
 Sassuolo made their debut in Serie B.

Events 
 June 26, 2008 – Marcello Lippi was appointed as Italy coach, replacing Roberto Donadoni.
 August 31, 2008 - Serie A season began.

National team 
Italy played the qualifying campaign for the 2010 FIFA World Cup. Italy also be participated in the FIFA Confederations Cup in mid-to-late June, 2009.

Key
 H = Home match
 A = Away match
 N = Neutral site
 WCQ = World Cup Qualifier
 F = friendly

Honours

Transfer deals 
 List of Italian football transfers Summer 2008

Deaths 
 July 15, 2008 — Gionata Mingozzi, 23, Treviso midfielder, killed in a car crash.
 August 2, 2008 — Gianni De Rosa, 51, former Napoli and Palermo striker, and Serie B 1980–81 topscorer, killed in a car crash.
 August 3, 2008 — Toni Allemann, 72, former Serie A striker with Mantova between 1961 and 1963, killed by a heart attack.
 August 17, 2008 — Franco Sensi, 82, Roma chairman and owner.
 August 25, 2008 — Mario Tortul, 77, former attacking wing with 252 appearances and 69 goals in the Italian Serie A in the 1950s, uncle of Fabio Capello.
 September 27, 2008 — Dino Mio, 85, chairman and owner of Lega Pro Prima Divisione club Portosummaga.
 November 8, 2008 — Régis Genaux, 35, Belgian former footballer, Udinese player between 1997 and 2003, killed by a heart attack caused by pulmonary embolism.
 February 22, 2009 — Candido Cannavò, 78, popular Italian sports and football journalist, editor-in-chief of La Gazzetta dello Sport between 1983 and 2002.
 March 20, 2009 — Pietro Arvedi D'Emilei, 79, president of Hellas Verona until January 2009, died of injuries sustained in a car crash in his way back from a league game on December 21, 2008.
 April 20, 2009 — Franco Rotella, 42, former Serie A player with Genoa between 1983 and 1991, killed by leukemia.

References 

 
Seasons in Italian football
2008 in Italian sport
2008 in association football
2009 in Italian sport
2009 in association football